The Transcaucasian ratsnake (Zamenis hohenackeri), also commonly known as the Gavand snake, is a species of nonvenomous ratsnake in the family Colubridae. The species is endemic to Western Asia and the Middle East .

Etymology
The specific name, hohenackeri, is in honor of Rudolph Friedrich Hohenacker, who was a Swiss missionary, physician, and naturalist.

Geographic range
Z. hohenackeri is found in Armenia, Azerbaijan, Georgia, Iran, Iraq, Israel, Lebanon, southwestern Russia, Syria, and Turkey.

Description
Dorsally, it is gray with four alternating series of dark brown spots. Ventrally, it is reddish or yellowish, marbled or spotted with gray. On the head, there is a diagonal black streak from the eye to the corner of the mouth, and a vertical black line below the eye.

Habitat
Z. hohenackeri is found in mountainous areas, in a variety of habitats, from dry to wet, including agricultural areas.

Reproduction
Z. hohenackeri is oviparous. Clutch size is 3–7 eggs.

Subspecies
Two subspecies are recognized as being valid, including the nominotypical subspecies.
Zamenis hohenackeri hohenackeri 
Zamenis hohenackeri tauricus 

Nota bene: A trinomial authority in parentheses indicates that the subspecies was originally described in a genus other than Zamenis hohenackeri.

References

Further reading
Strauch A (1873). "Die Schlangen des Russischen Reichs, in systematischer und zoogeographischer Beziehung ". Mémoires de l'Académie Impériale des Sciences de Saint-Pétersbourg, [Seventh Series] 21 (4): 1-288 + Plates I-VI. (Coluber hohenackeri, new species, pp. 69–73 + Plate II, figures a-b). (in German and Latin).
Utiger, Urs; Helfenberger, Notker; Schätti, Beat; Schmidt, Catherine; Ruf, Markus; Ziswiler Vincent (2002). "Molecular systematics and phylogeny of Old World and New World ratsnakes, Elaphe Auct., and related genera (Reptilia, Squamata, Colubridae)". Russian Journal of Herpetology 9 (2): 105–124. (Zamenis hohenackeri, new combination).
Werner F (1898). "Über einige neue Reptilien und einen neuen Frosch aus dem cilisischen Taurus ". Zoologischer Anzeiger 21 (555): 217–223. (Coluber tauricus, new species, pp. 217–220). (in German).

Reptiles described in 1873
Reptiles of the Middle East
Reptiles of Russia